The Mulvey Mercantile is a two-story, red brick commercial building in Yukon, Oklahoma. It was constructed in 1904 as a dry goods store by the Mulvey brothers, and the firm was the largest retail store in the city until the Great Depression. It operated as a hardware store for many years, and is currently occupied by a home decor business.

The building was listed on the National Register of Historic Places in 1982.

References

National Register of Historic Places in Canadian County, Oklahoma
Buildings and structures completed in 1904
Buildings and structures in Canadian County, Oklahoma